This is a list of cathedrals in France and in the French overseas departments, territories and collectivities, including both actual and former diocesan cathedrals (seats of bishops). Almost all cathedrals in France are Roman Catholic, but any non-Roman Catholic cathedrals are listed here as well.

The list is intended to be complete as far as current cathedrals and co-cathedrals are concerned. It is not yet an exhaustive list of former cathedrals, although it includes most of them.

A number of large churches in France are known as "cathedral" as a mark of distinction or historical importance but have never been the seats of bishops. These are not included here.

Roman Catholic cathedrals

Non-Roman Catholic cathedrals

Cathedrals in overseas departments, territories and collectivities

See also
List of cathedrals
List of basilicas in France

References

Sources

 List of Cathedrals in France by GCatholic.org
 Catholic Hierarchy
 Mapping Gothic by Columbia University

France
Cathedrals
Cathedrals